Stefanos Polyzos (born 16 August 1995) is a Greek professional footballer who plays as a midfielder for Football League club Veria.

External links
 
 onsports

1995 births
Living people
Greek footballers
PAOK FC players
Olympiacos Volos F.C. players
People from Siatista
Association football midfielders
Footballers from Western Macedonia